Vial is a French, English, and Italian surname. Notable people with the surname include:

Del Vial (1891–?), French World War I flying ace
Dennis Vial (born 1969), Canadian ice hockey player
Laurent Vial (born 1959), Swiss cyclist
Leigh Vial (1909–1943), Australian patrol officer and explorer
Manuel Camilo Vial (1804–1882), Chilean politician
Noelle Vial (1959–2003), Irish poet
Octavio Vial (born 1919), French football manager
Patrick Vial (born 1946), French judoka
Pedro Vial (born ca. 1746) French explorer in North America
Pierre-Alexandre Vial (born 1975), French decathlete
Stéphane Vial (born 1973), French shot putter